Fabrizio Rampazzo (born 7 April 1963) is an Italian former swimmer who competed in the 1980 Summer Olympics, in the 1984 Summer Olympics, and in the 1988 Summer Olympics. He was born in Padua.

Rampazzo is a former athlete of the Gruppo Sportivo Fiamme Oro.

References

1963 births
Living people
Sportspeople from Padua
Italian male swimmers
Italian male freestyle swimmers
Italian male butterfly swimmers
Olympic swimmers of Italy
Swimmers at the 1980 Summer Olympics
Swimmers at the 1984 Summer Olympics
Swimmers at the 1988 Summer Olympics
Swimmers at the 1979 Mediterranean Games
Swimmers at the 1987 Mediterranean Games
Mediterranean Games gold medalists for Italy
Mediterranean Games medalists in swimming
Swimmers of Fiamme Oro